Bülent Eken (26 October 1923 – 25 July 2016) was a Turkish footballer and coach. He played most of his career at Galatasaray SK, but also played for Salernitana and Palermo in Italy. After his career he became a manager and he coached in Italy, In 1967, he went to Turkey as an assistant coach for Galatasaray SK. He coached the Turkey national football team during 1962. He represented his country at the 1948 Summer Olympics and the 1954 FIFA World Cup. Eken died on 25 July 2016, nineteen days after the death of his teammate Turgay Şeren.

Honours
Galatasaray
Istanbul Football League: 1948–49, 1954–55

References 

1923 births
2016 deaths
Turkish footballers
Turkish football managers
Turkish expatriate footballers
Galatasaray S.K. footballers
Serie A managers
1954 FIFA World Cup players
Serie A players
Serie B players
U.S. Salernitana 1919 players
Palermo F.C. players
Expatriate footballers in Italy
Turkey international footballers
Footballers at the 1948 Summer Olympics
Olympic footballers of Turkey
Turkey national football team managers
Karşıyaka S.K. managers
Beyoğlu SK managers
Fatih Karagümrük S.K. managers
Association football defenders
Sportspeople from Mersin
İzmirspor managers